Staatsfeind Nr. 1 ("Public Enemy No. 1") is the third solo album by German rapper Bushido, released 4 November 2005 via ersguterjunge. Features include Baba Saad, D-Bo, Chakuza, Billy13, Eko Fresh, Godsilla, and J.R. Writer. The album received gold status in Germany for more than 100,000 units sold. Two singles were released, "Endgegner" and "Augenblick".

Track listing

Samples
"Engel" contains a sample of "Alt Lys Er Svunnet Hen" by Dimmu Borgir
"Ab 18" features an interpolation of "Only U" by Ashanti
"Staatsfeind Nr. 1" contains a sample of "Dirty Diana" by Michael Jackson
"Sieh in meine Augen" contains a sample of "Part of Me" by Lara Fabian
"Bis wir uns wiedersehen" contains a sample of "Fade to Black" by Apocalyptica which is a cover of "Fade to Black" by Metallica
"Mein Leben lang" contains a sample of "A Piece of the Action" by The Babys
"Der Bösewicht" contains a sample of "Welcome Me Love" by The Brooklyn Bridge
"Outro" contains a sample of "Diamonds and Rust" by Joan Baez

References

External links
[Musik Bushido klaut von Nox Arcana - Zeitzeuge]

2005 albums
Bushido (rapper) albums
German-language albums